Kurla is a village in Türi Parish, Järva County in central Estonia.

Politician August Rei (1886–1963) was born in Kurla.

References

 

Villages in Järva County
Kreis Fellin